The Patriarch of Alexandria (also known as the Bishop of Alexandria or Pope of Alexandria) is the highest-ranking bishop of Egypt. The Patriarchs trace back their lineage to Mark the Evangelist.

Following the Council of Chalcedon in 451, a schism occurred in Egypt, between those who accepted and those who rejected the decisions of the council. The former are known as Chalcedonians and the latter are known as miaphysites. Over the next several decades, these two parties competed on the See of Alexandria and frequently still recognized the same Patriarch. But after 536, they permanently established separate patriarchates, and have maintained separate lineages of Patriarchs. The miaphysites became the Coptic Church (part of Oriental Orthodoxy) and the Chalcedonians became the Greek Orthodox Church of Alexandria (part of the wider Eastern Orthodox Church).

Therefore, this list only contains those Patriarchs who served up until 536. For later Popes and Patriarchs, follow the links at the bottom of this page.

List of patriarchs (prior to 536)
Mark the Evangelist (43–68)
Anianus (68–85)
Avilius (85–98)
Kedron (98–109)
Primus (109–121)
Justus (121–131)
Eumenes (131–141)
Markianos (142–152)
Celadion (152–166)
Agrippinus (167–178)
Julian (178–189)
Demetrius I (189–232)
Heraclas (232–248)
Dionysius (248–264)
Maximus (265–282)
Theonas (282–300)
Peter I (300–311)
Achillas (312–313)
Alexander I (313–326), First Ecumenical Council occurred
Athanasius I (328–339) Served as a Deacon for the First Council; later became Pope of Alexandria
Gregory of Cappadocia (339–346), an Arian installed by the Emperor.
Athanasius I (restored) (346–373)
Peter II (373–380)
Timothy I (380–385), Second Ecumenical Council occurred
Theophilus I (385–412)
Cyril I (412–444), Third Ecumenical Council occurred
Dioscorus I (444–451), Second Council of Ephesus occurred. Pope Dioscorus was later deposed by the Council of Chalcedon but still recognized by Miaphysites until his death in 454.
Proterius (451–457) Deposed by Coptic (Alexandrian) Synod under Timothy II Aelurus, Chalcedonian
Timothy II Aelurus (457–460), Miaphysite
Timothy III Salophakiolos (460–475), Chalcedonian but not recognized by Miaphysites who continued to recognise Timothy II AelurusTimothy II Aelurus (restored) (475–477), Miaphysite
Peter III Mongus (477), MiaphysiteTimothy III Salophakiolos (restored) (477–481), Chalcedonian
John I Talaia, (481–482), Chalcedonian but not recognized by Miaphysites who continued to recognise Peter III MongusPeter III Mongus (restored)'' (482–490), Miaphysite
Athanasius II (490–496), Miaphysite
John I (496–505), Miaphysite
John II (505–516), Miaphysite
Dioscorus II (516–517), Miaphysite
Timothy III (517–535), Miaphysite
Theodosius I (535–536), Miaphysite
Gainas (536), in opposition to Theodosius

In 536 the Greek Orthodox Church of Alexandria withdrew their recognition of Theodosius I and elected Paul as Patriarch, while the Coptic Orthodox Church of Alexandria continued to recognize Theodosius. For later succession of (Coptic) Popes and (Greek) Patriarchs, see:
List of Coptic Orthodox Popes of Alexandria.
List of Greek Orthodox Patriarchs of Alexandria.

See also
Patriarch of Alexandria

External links
Coptic Papal Residence
Greek Orthodox Patriarchate of Alexandria
Claremont Coptic Encyclopedia

 
History of Christianity in Africa
Alexandria
Patriarchs of Alexandria
Patriarchs of Alexandria